History of Photography, founded in 1977, is a quarterly peer-reviewed academic journal covering the history of photography and published by Taylor & Francis. The editor-in-chief is Patrizia Di Bello  (Birkbeck College, University of London). The journal is abstracted and indexed in America: History and Life, Art Index, Avery Index to Architectural Periodicals, Bibliography of the History of Art, British Humanities Index, Historical Abstracts, Scopus, Current Contents/Arts & Humanities, and the Arts and Humanities Citation Index.

References

External links 
 
 Print: 
 Online: 

English-language journals
Taylor & Francis academic journals
Quarterly journals
 Journals
Art history journals